Padeniya is a village in Sri Lanka. It is located within North Western Province.

See also
List of towns in North Western Province, Sri Lanka
Padeniya is a small city of Kurunegala in North Western Province. which is about 25 km away from the Kurunegala City.
Padeniya is located in Puttalam- Kurunegala Main Road between Nikaweratiya and Wariyapola. Padeniya provides a Junction the Anuradhapura.

External links

Populated places in North Western Province, Sri Lanka
Grama Niladhari divisions of Sri Lanka